Saint-Hilaire-le-Lierru is a former commune in the Sarthe department in the region of Pays de la Loire in north-western France. On 1 January 2016, it was merged into the new commune of Tuffé-Val-de-la-Chéronne. Its population was 132 in 2019.

See also
Communes of the Sarthe department

References

Former communes of Sarthe